{{DISPLAYTITLE:C22H26N2O4}}

The molecular formula C22H26N2O4 (molar mass: 382.5 g/mol) may refer to:

 Akuammine
 Aspidophytine
 Tofisopam, a benzodiazepine derivative